St. Xavier's Senior Secondary School, Bathinda, Punjab, India, is an affiliate of the registered Society of Pilar, Punjab-Haryana, a branch of the society of Pilar, Goa.  Inaugurated in 1983, it is a Catholic institute located in Model Town Phase-2 Bathinda. The school's patron is St. Francis Xavier. The first principal of the school was Father Anthony D'Silva. The school provides KG, primary and secondary education. 

Originally an all-boys school, it opened its portals to girls in April 1990. The program of studies is in accordance with the syllabus laid down by the Central Board of Secondary Education, Delhi.

It has a junior branch for students of kindergarten to grade four, situated on Power House Road, along with a church. Facing the junior wing lies an orphanage of the same society, adjacent to which is Xavierian Healthcare & Clinical Lab. With 100+ faculty members, it has approximately 4000  students, the school has a teacher-student ratio of  1:40 and an average class size of 50 to 65 students.

Society of Pilar 
The organization which operates this school is a NGO known as society of Pilar. It was founded by a Fr. Bento Martins in 1887 in Goa. Initially the society's activities were limited to Goa and its adjoining areas but from 1939 it spread across India and even abroad.

Now the society owns about 60 residential units and 400 members working in several parts of India. The society has many branches all over india and abroad. The society mainly runs schools, colleges and orphanages besides other institutions.

Patron 
The school patronizes Saint Francis Xavier, a catholic missionary and saint who was a co-founder of the society of Jesus. He was born in 1506 to a noble family in Spain. He arrived at Goa in 1542 and played an important in building many churches and institutions in Goa, he also  travelled across Malacca, China and Japan.

He died in 1552 on his way to China. His remains were bought to goa in 1554 and are kept at the Basilica of Bom Jesus in a silver casket. He was beatified by Pope Paul V in 1619 and canonized together with St. Ignatius by Pope Gregory XV, on March 12, 1622.

Curriculum 
The school provides for the study of many subject including English Language, English Literature, Hindi Language, Hindi Literature, Mathematics, Sciences, Social Sciences, Punjabi, Moral Science, General Knowledge, Art & Craft, Computers and EVS.

Important extra curricular activities are also provided by the school which include Sports, Games, S.U.P.W., Music, Dance, Debates, Declamations, and Dramatics.

Infrastructure 
The school premises has four entrances. The school building is divided into four floors. The ground floor contains the Principal's office and the clerical office. Each grade has been assigned a different floor. Each floor has been provided with staff rooms, washrooms and potable water. The school also has a biology lab, a chemistry lab, a physics lab, an auditorium, a library, a shooting range, a basketball court and a multipurpose school ground.

Photos

See also 
Mahant Gurbanta Das School for Deaf & Dumb
Adesh University

External links

Sources 

Christian schools in Punjab, India
Private schools in Punjab, India
Education in Bathinda
1983 establishments in Punjab, India
Educational institutions established in 1983